Torre de la Escollera was a  tall residential skyscraper with 58 floors planned to be built in Cartagena, Colombia.  The under construction building suffered severe structural damage during a storm on 13 May 2007, and was dismantled later that year. Had it been completed, it would have been the tallest building in Colombia.

Design 
It would have been divided into 88 apartments, with the upper floors having just one apartment per floor, topped by a 3-level penthouse apartment and a rooftop helipad. With prices between 500 million and 1,200 million Colombian Pesos, the apartments would have been the most expensive in Colombia. Other facilities would have included a swimming pool and a spa.

Construction started in 2005. However, on 13 May 2007, with the building still under construction, a storm hit the city. The high winds and a lack of diagonal bracing, caused a  twist in the steel structure between floors 28 and 40. Construction was suspended and the Society of Engineers and Architects of Bolívar recommended the building be demolished. The building was dismantled from July to November 2007.

See also 

 Unfinished building
 List of tallest structures in South America

References 

Unfinished buildings and structures
Buildings and structures in Cartagena, Colombia